Michael Clarence McMahon Sr. (February 1, 1915 – December 3, 1974) was a Canadian professional ice hockey player who played 57 games in the National Hockey League between 1943 and 1946. Born in Brockville, Ontario, he played for the Montreal Canadiens and Boston Bruins. He won the Stanley Cup in 1944 with the Montreal Canadiens. His son Mike McMahon Jr. also played in the NHL.

Career statistics

Regular season and playoffs

External links 
 
Obituary at LostHockey.com

1915 births
1974 deaths
Boston Bruins players
Buffalo Bisons (AHL) players
Canadian ice hockey defencemen
Canadian people of Irish descent
Cornwall Flyers players
Dallas Texans (USHL) players
Houston Huskies players
Ice hockey people from Ontario
Montreal Canadiens players
Montreal Royals (QSHL) players
Ottawa Senators (QSHL) players
Place of death missing
Springfield Indians players
Sportspeople from Brockville
Stanley Cup champions